Posht-e Pian (also Romanized as Posht-e Pīān; also known as Posht Peyūn and Posht Peyvan) is a village in Pian Rural District, in the Central District of Izeh County, Khuzestan Province, Iran. At the 2006 census, its population was 2,372, in 458 families.

References 

Populated places in Izeh County